Kurt Lilien (born Kurt Lilienthal; 6 August 1882 – 28 May 1943) was a German actor. He appeared in 50 films between 1919 and 1933. Lilien was born into a Jewish family, Lilien would be arrested and sent to Sobibor extermination camp by the Nazis where he was murdered in 1943.

Selected filmography

 Maciste and the Silver King's Daughter (1922)
 A Crazy Night (1927)
 The Most Beautiful Legs of Berlin (1927)
 Dolly Gets Ahead (1930)
 Rag Ball (1930)
 Hocuspocus (1930)
 Die zärtlichen Verwandten (1930)
 Flachsmann the Educator (1930)
 Susanne Cleans Up (1930)
 My Leopold (1931)
 The Soaring Maiden (1931)
 Bobby Gets Going (1931)
 Weekend in Paradise (1931)
 Every Woman Has Something (1931)
 Grock (1931)
 My Heart Longs for Love (1931)
 A Woman Branded (1931)
 Headfirst into Happiness (1931)
 When the Soldiers (1931)
 I'll Stay with You (1931)
 Johnny Steals Europe (1932)
 The Testament of Cornelius Gulden (1932)
 Two Hearts Beat as One (1932)
 Scandal on Park Street (1932)
 Gitta Discovers Her Heart (1932)
 The Importance of Being Earnest (1932)
 Greetings and Kisses, Veronika (1933)
 The Roberts Case (1933)
 Manolescu, Prince of Thieves (1933)
 What Women Dream (1933)
 And Who Is Kissing Me? (1933)

References

External links

1882 births
1943 deaths
German male film actors
German male silent film actors
German male stage actors
German male musical theatre actors
20th-century German male actors
Jewish German male actors
German Jews who died in the Holocaust
German people who died in Sobibor extermination camp
German male comedians
Male actors from Berlin